The 2013–14 Australian Athletics Championships was the 92nd edition of the national championship in outdoor track and field for Australia. It was held from 3–6 April 2014 at Lakeside Stadium in Melbourne. It served as a selection meeting for Australia at the 2014 Commonwealth Games. The 10,000 metres event took place separately at the Zatopek 10K on 12 December 2013 at the same venue.

Medal summary

Men

Women

References

External links 
 Athletics Australia website

2014
Australian Athletics Championships
Australian Championships
Athletics Championships
Sports competitions in Melbourne
2010s in Melbourne